Hott Peak is a steep ridgelike mountain with a sharp peak rising to 1550 meters between Mount James and Mount Mahony in the east Helicopter Mountains of the Saint Johns Range. Named by the Advisory Committee on Antarctic Names in 2007 after Ronald Dale Hott, a helicopter mechanic in support of the U.S. Antarctic Program at McMurdo Sound and the McMurdo Dry Valleys in 10 austral field seasons, from 1998–99 to 2007–08.

References

Mountains of Victoria Land